Accuphase Laboratory, Inc. (originally known as Kensonic Laboratory, Inc.) is a Japanese, Yokohama-based high-end audio equipment manufacturer founded by former Kenwood engineer Jiro Kasuga in late 1972. Kasuga was not happy with the views of Kenwood relating to the follower of their High-End Supreme 1 unit (1967). He hired some engineers from other prominent brands (Marantz, Luxman) and started Kensonic, with Kenwood as a part owner. Some other connections in the early years of Accuphase exist as well. If you compare the parts used by Kenwood and Kensonic throughout the latter's early years, the familiarities show quite easy: knobs, buttons, tuner dials and the general direction of the design. Accuphase's early PCBs are tagged KENSONIC, too, and the early units bore KENSONIC on their frontplates as well. Until the mid-1990s, Kenwood still owned part of Kensonic. It appears that Accuphase engineers may have had a hand in the engineering of Kenwood's last high-end series (L-A1, L-D1 and LVD-Z1). For example, the Accuphase E-405 and Kenwood L-A1 have very similar volume knobs, side panels, and remotes.

Kensonic's first products were the P-300 amp(lifier), the C-200 preamp, and the T-100 tuner. The E-202 integrated amp and an up-versioned tuner (the T-101) were added soon after. All received very positive reviews in 1973 and 1974. While Kenwood has now abandoned all high-end audio activities, Kensonic carries on with the Accuphase series.

Accuphase products are well regarded by high-end audio enthusiasts, but the brand is uncommon in the USA. Accuphase products are readily identified by their large Champagne-colored faceplates and large dual analog power meters – which are similar to the respected McIntosh Laboratory brand (McIntosh is famous for its unique faceplates, which are made of silk-screened glass and use large blue analog power meters).   

Accuphase explains the brand name as follows:
 

Accuphase has a good reputation for quality, with units from the first series still in use. Models remain available at least for several years, and sometimes up to a decade.  

The Accuphase website explains the background and development of each of their products.

References

External links
 Accuphase website
 Accuphase past products
 The Accuphase section on Hifishark.com, maybe the most complete model list in the world.

Electronics companies established in 1972
Audio amplifier manufacturers
Audio equipment manufacturers of Japan
Compact Disc player manufacturers
Manufacturing companies based in Yokohama
Japanese companies established in 1972
Japanese brands